Myles D. "Mike" Evans (December 3, 1901 – November 11, 1982) was an American football player and coach. He served as the head football coach at Hiram College from 1928 to 1930, compiling a record of 4–19.

References

1901 births
1982 deaths
American football guards
American football tackles
Cleveland Panthers players
Hiram Terriers football coaches
Ohio Wesleyan Battling Bishops football players
Players of American football from Cleveland